Ramon Bernard Harewood (born 3 February 1987) is a former Barbadian American football offensive tackle. He played college football at Morehouse College in Atlanta, Georgia, was drafted in the 6th Round of the 2010 NFL Draft, the Ravens signing him to a three-year contract.

Professional career

Baltimore Ravens
He was drafted in the sixth round by the Baltimore Ravens of the 2010 NFL Draft.
Harewood's 2010–2011 season ended prior to the first regular season game, when he underwent surgery on each of his knees and was subsequently placed on injured reserve. His second NFL season was also ended before the start of the regular season, due to surgery on torn ankle ligaments and the Ravens again placing him on injured reserve.

After spending two seasons on injured reserve, Harewood went into the 2012 season and won the starting job at left guard. He made his debut in week 1 of the NFL season against the Cincinnati Bengals. He would play every offensive snap for the first five weeks of the season as well as some on special teams. However, despite playing well during this time, he lost his starting job to the veteran Bobbie Williams, who had been picked during the offseason prior to the start of the season. Harewood would remain inactive until Week 17 against the Bengals, where he played one offensive snap along with four snaps on special teams. He would not play another snap in the NFL, but would earn a Super Bowl ring when the Ravens defeated the San Francisco 49ers 34–31 in Super Bowl XLVII.

On 25 August 2013, he was waived by the Ravens.

Denver Broncos
Harewood, along with seven other players, were signed to future contracts with the Denver Broncos on 22 January 2014. He was waived by the Broncos on 3 June 2014.

See also
List of Barbadian Americans

References

External links
Baltimore Ravens bio
Morehouse Maroon Tigers

1987 births
Living people
American football offensive tackles
American football offensive guards
Baltimore Ravens players
Barbadian expatriate sportspeople in the United States
Barbadian players of American football
Morehouse Maroon Tigers football players
People from Saint Michael, Barbados